Monument Square may refer to:

 Battle Monument Square (Baltimore, Maryland)
 Monument to the Great Fire of London#Monument Square
 Monument Square (Portland, Maine)
 Monument Square (Charlottesville, Virginia), former location of the George Rogers Clark (sculpture)
 Monument Square Historic District (Charlestown, Boston, Massachusetts), location of the Bunker Hill Monument
 Monument Square Historic District (Jamaica Plain, Boston, Massachusetts), location of the First Church of Jamaica Plain
 Monument Square, surrounding Soldiers and Sailors Monument (Troy, New York)